is a traditional music dance which originates from the Bangwaketse tribe of Kanye village and surrounding areas in Botswana, such as Sesung, Selokolela and Molapo wa Basadi villages. Setapa traditional dance was started by Bangwaketse in the past and therefore it is regarded as the dance for the tribe. Setapa involves a group of people stamping in to the ground with their feet to the song played or sung by the choir or the group. The word is derived from the Tswana word , which means to step into the ground continuously. Setapa troupes involves an equal mix of both men and women dressed up with the skin of animals. The dance troupes wear brown shells in their feet which gives out a perfect sound as they dance and the males usually carry on whistles and heifer horns to produce sound from the stream of air or as they blow into them.

Types of Setapa Music Dance 
Setapa music dance exists in three different types, which are:
 : this is a kind of dance which is performed and produces the sound of a galloping horse in the ground.
 : The kind of Bangwaketse dance is performed by dragging feet on the ground.  is a Tswana phrase which means to drag feet. The dance is adopted from the neighbourhood tribe Basarwa dance called . The cause of dance adoption in the three types mentioned is sharing of borders between districts.

Setapa costume 
Setapa troupes wear flip flops called  made of tyres, and knee shin guard like made of animal skins including the hare and antelope, spring boks and duikers. The trousers used by men are called  and also made of antelope skin, they are usually cut short or rolled up to the knee level to allow for the shin and diphamphathana.
The females never used  like males instead they used some sandals made from an oxen head skin. The females sandals were called  in Tswana.
Setapa Costume ended in the olden days, nowadays the Setapa generation put on some fashion clothes such as some prints by Germans, whilst males put on some fashion blazers and formal trousers and they use their leg rattles to produce rattling sound as they dance.

References 

Dance in Botswana
Kweneng District